The 2022 World Junior Wrestling Championships (U20) was the 45th edition of the World Junior Wrestling Championships and was held in Sofia, Bulgaria between 15 and 21 August 2022.

Competition schedule
All times are (UTC+3)

Medal table

Team ranking

Medal overview

Men's freestyle

Greco-Roman

Women's freestyle

Participating nations 
562 wrestlers from 49 countries:

  (5)
  (19)
  (3)
  (20)
  (3)
  (3)
  (24) (Host)
  (11)
  (3)
  (4)
  (7)
  (13)
  (2)
  (5)
  (5)
  (8)
  (1)
  (20)
  (11)
  (13)
  (2)
  (17)
  (30)
  (20)
  (3)
  (11)
  (27)
  (30)
  (22)
  (7)
  (2)
  (7)
  (15)
  (6)
  (4)
  (6)
  (18)
  (15)
  (6)
  (4)
  (5)
  (8)
  (2)
  (6)
  (2)
  (30)
  (28)
  (30)
  (19)

References

External links 
 Database
 Official results

World Junior Championships
Wrestling Championships
International wrestling competitions hosted by Bulgaria
Sport in Sofia
Wrestling in Bulgaria
World Junior Wrestling Championships
World Wrestling Championships